Beau Reynald Bartlett (born February 26, 2001) is an American freestyle and folkstyle wrestler who competes internationally at 65 kilograms and collegiately at 141 pounds. In freestyle, he claimed a bronze medal from the 2021 Junior World Championships. He is currently a sophomore at 141 pounds for the Penn State Nittany Lions.

Folkstyle career

High school 
Bartlett, a Tempe, Arizona native, moved to Kingston, Pennsylvania in 2014 to attend Wyoming Seminary. There, he became the first four–time prep national champion in the school's history and also claimed titles in the Powerade Tournament and the Walsh Jesuit Ironman. On October 5, 2019, Bartlett competed at Who's Number One, where he defended his #1 spot in the rankings by defeating Ryan Sokol from Simley High School.

University 
After his high school junior year concluded, in May 2019, he committed to four–time NCAA champion and PSU's head coach Cael Sanderson, as the top-ranked 133-pounder and sixth-ranked pound–for–pound by FloWrestling.

2020-21 
At the start of the season, Bartlett competed on the junior varsity team at 141 pounds, as teammate and two-time All-American Nick Lee was starting. On February 14, he made his debut at 149 pounds, winning an extra match. Five days later, Bartlett made his dual-meet debut, becoming the starter over teammate and 2015 Cadet World Champion Jarod Verkleeren and losing in a razor-close match against second-ranked and then-undefeated Sammy Sasso from Ohio State. He won his match in the last dual of the season against Maryland and also won another extra match, entering the postseason with a 7–1 record. During the postseason, Bartlett, the 11th seed, went 1–2 at the Big Ten Conference Championships, failing to qualify for the NCAA championships.

Freestyle career

Age–group 
Bartlett's made his cadet level debut at the 2016 Phil Portuese Northeastern Regionals, where he placed first in freestyle and Greco. At the 2016 UWW US Nationals, he placed eight in freestyle and did not place in Greco. In 2017, he once again won the NE Regionals, now only in freestyle. In 2018, he competed and won the US Cadet Pan American Team Trials in both styles. At the Pan American Championships, he compiled two falls in the quarter and semifinals and a technical fall in the finals of the freestyle bracket, claiming gold. In 2021, Bartlett made his junior level debut, and went on to become the 2021 US Junior World Team Member after cleaning out the bracket at the US Nationals, and will now compete at the Junior World Championships in August.

Senior level

2019 
As a high school junior, Bartlett made his senior level debut on April 24–27 at the US Open Championships at 61 kilograms. Despite an early elimination in the second round (after a BYE in the first one), he bounced back with wins over graduated Nittany Lion and NCAA Division I All-American Jordan Conaway (by fall), Michigan Wolverine junior Austin Assad and 13'-14' collegiate graduate and three-time DI qualifier Shelton Mack (ninth seed), before being tech'ed by two-time World Cup silver medalist Tony Ramos, to place eight.

2020 
Bartlett met two-time NCAA Division I National finalist Bryce Meredith at the NLWC II, on October 20. He lost the high-pace match on points (6-8). He bounced back with a win over Kair Orine from NC State on December 22, at the NLWC IV.

Freestyle record 

! colspan="7"| Senior Freestyle Matches
|-
!  Res.
!  Record
!  Opponent
!  Score
!  Date
!  Event
!  Location
|-
|Win
|4–3
|align=left| Kai Orine
|style="font-size:88%"|TF 10–0
|style="font-size:88%"|December 22, 2020
|style="font-size:88%"|NLWC IV
|style="text-align:left;font-size:88%;"|
 State College, Pennsylvania
|-
|Loss
|3–3
|align=left| Bryce Meredith
|style="font-size:88%"|6–8
|style="font-size:88%"|October 20, 2020
|style="font-size:88%"|NLWC II
|style="text-align:left;font-size:88%;"|
 State College, Pennsylvania
|-
! style=background:white colspan=7 | 
|-
|Loss
|3–2
|align=left| Tony Ramos
|style="font-size:88%"|TF 0–10
|style="font-size:88%" rowspan=5|April 24–27, 2019
|style="font-size:88%" rowspan=5|2019 US Open National Championships
|style="text-align:left;font-size:88%;" rowspan=5|
 Las Vegas, Nevada
|-
|Win
|3–1
|align=left| Shelton Mack
|style="font-size:88%"|8–5
|-
|Win
|2–1
|align=left| Austin Assad
|style="font-size:88%"|13–9
|-
|Win
|1–1
|align=left| Jordan Conaway
|style="font-size:88%"|Fall
|-
|Loss
|0–1
|align=left| Cody Brewer
|style="font-size:88%"|TF 1–11
|-

NCAA record 

! colspan="8"| NCAA Division I Record
|-
!  Res.
!  Record
!  Opponent
!  Score
!  Date
!  Event
|-
! style=background:white colspan=6 |2021 Big Ten Conference DNP at 149 lbs
|-
|Loss
|8–3
|align=left| Yahya Thomas
|style="font-size:88%"|SV–1 5–7
|style="font-size:88%" rowspan=3|March 6–7, 2021
|style="font-size:88%" rowspan=3|2021 Big Ten Conference Championships
|-
|Win
|8–2
|align=left| Michael North
|style="font-size:88%"|Fall
|-
|Loss
|7–2
|align=left| Michael Blockhus
|style="font-size:88%"|5–3
|-
|Win
|7–1
|align=left| Lucas Cordio
|style="font-size:88%"|15–7
|style="font-size:88%" rowspan=2|February 21, 2021
|style="font-size:88%"|Penn State Maryland Extra
|-
|Win
|6–1
|align=left| Hunter Baxter
|style="font-size:88%"|9–3
|style="font-size:88%"|Maryland - Penn State Dual
|-
|Loss
|5–1
|align=left| Sammy Sasso
|style="font-size:88%"|3–5
|style="font-size:88%"|February 19, 2021
|style="font-size:88%"|Penn State - Ohio State Dual
|-
|Win
|5–0
|align=left| Cole Mattin
|style="font-size:88%"|8–4
|style="font-size:88%"|February 14, 2021
|style="font-size:88%"|Michigan Penn State Extra
|-
|Win
|4–0
|align=left| Dominic Dentino
|style="font-size:88%"|13–6
|style="font-size:88%"|February 2, 2021
|style="font-size:88%"|Penn State Wisconsin Extra
|-
|Win
|3–0
|align=left| Justin Benjamin
|style="font-size:88%"|10–4
|style="font-size:88%" rowspan=3|January 30, 2021
|style="font-size:88%"|Penn State Northwestern Extra
|-
|Win
|2–0
|align=left| Colin Valdiviez
|style="font-size:88%"|8–4
|style="font-size:88%"|Penn State Northwestern Extra
|-
|Win
|1–0
|align=left| Jacob Moran
|style="font-size:88%"|Fall
|style="font-size:88%"|Indiana Penn State Extra
|-
! style=background:lighgrey colspan=6 |Start of 2020-2021 Season (freshman year)

Stats 

!  Season
!  Year
!  School
!  Rank
!  Weigh Class
!  Record
!  Win
!  Bonus
|-
|2021
|Freshman
||Penn State University
|#23
|149
|8–3
|72.73%
|27.27%
|-
|colspan=5 bgcolor="LIGHTGREY"|Career
|bgcolor="LIGHTGREY"|8–3
|bgcolor="LIGHTGREY"|72.73%
|bgcolor="LIGHTGREY"|27.27%

References 

Living people
2001 births
American male sport wrestlers
Penn State Nittany Lions wrestlers
People from Tempe, Arizona
Sportspeople from Tempe, Arizona
People from Arizona
Sportspeople from Arizona
Penn State Nittany Lions
Pennsylvania State University alumni